Yuan of the Red Army Command (also called ) are banknotes issued by the Soviet military command in Northeast China in 1945–1946.

History 

In February 1945, at the Yalta Conference, the Soviet Union undertook to enter the war with Japan no later than 3 months after the defeat of Germany.  On August 8, the USSR declared war on Japan; on August 9, hostilities began in Manchuria.  By August 20, 1945, the main hostilities ended, and individual clashes continued until September 10.  Soviet troops occupied Manchuria.

Money circulation in China was in a chaotic state, a single emission center did not exist.  In Manchuria, the yuan of Manchukuo and the money of other puppet Chinese governments were in circulation.  To pay for purchases of food and other goods and services needed to provide Soviet military units, the Soviet military command launched the release of military money.  Banknotes of 1, 5, 10 and 100 yuan were issued, printed in the USSR.  On banknotes with colored patterns - inscriptions in hieroglyphs.

The issue was made until May 1946 and was stopped with the withdrawal of the Soviet troops, by this time denominations of 1 and 5 yuan due to inflation were practically not used in circulation.  Banknotes of 10 and 100 yuan with stickers affixed with signs continued to be used in circulation until the issuance of new banknotes in China.

List of banknotes

See also 

 Manchukuo yuan
 Tuvan akşa

References

Bibliography 
 
 
 中国革命战争纪实。解放战争。东北卷 (Полная история Революционной войны. Освободительная война. Том «Северо-восток»), — Пекин: «Народное издательство», 2004.  

Manchuria
Currencies of China
Modern obsolete currencies